Chaderghat is considered one of the busiest areas of Hyderabad city and is located on the banks of Musi River. Chaderghat Bridge was built during the time of the Nizams and connects major suburbs to the main city. The original name of Chadherghat was "Oliphant Nagar".

History
The Urdu word Chadar is used to refer to a white sheet. The locality was so-called after an anicut across the river which formed a ‘Chadar’ or a sheet of water. The famous Chaderghat bridge, or Oliphant Bridge as it was known then, was built in 1831 and named after James Oliphant.

Chaderghat was first declared a Municipality in 1886. In 1933, it was merged with Hyderabad Municipality to form Hyderabad Municipal Corporation. Chaderghat is surrounded by Koti, Gowliguda, Kachiguda, Darulshifa and Malakpet Localities.

Commercial Significance

There is a shopping area with various shopping malls and corner grocery stores.

The Hyderabadi restaurant, Niagara is located here. This is also a home to few popular movie theatres Kamal and Tirumala which are now closed because of space issues. Chaderghat main road is named after former Indian President Dr. Rajendra Prasad, and is also referred as Dr. Rajendra Prasad Marg.

Health Institutes
It is home to the multi-speciality hospitals like Care Hospital. The Yashoda Hospital is located nearby at Malakpet.

Transport
Chaderghat is well connected by TSRTC buses.

The nearest MMTS Train station is at Malakpet.

TSRTC bus terminal MGBS (Mahatma Gandhi Bus Station) is located 0.5 km from Chaderghat.

References

Neighbourhoods in Hyderabad, India
Bridges in Telangana